The Hartt School is the comprehensive performing arts conservatory of the University of Hartford located in West Hartford, Connecticut, United States, that offers degree programs in music, dance, and theatre.  Founded in 1920 by Julius Hartt and Moshe Paranov, Hartt has been part of the University of Hartford since its charter merged the then Hartt College of Music, the Hartford Art School, and Hillyer College to create the university in 1957. The Hartt School offers undergraduate and graduate degrees in music, dance, and theatre, and associated disciplines.  The Hartt Community Division offers a variety of opportunities in music and dance for students of all ages, backgrounds, and abilities.

Organ Studies 
Since its founding, Hartt had an organ program of study. In 1970, the school acquired a new Gress-Miles pipe organ; it was inaugurated with a performance of Bach's Wir glauben all' an einen Gott. The organ program's director, John Holtz, subsequently launched the International Contemporary Organ Music Festival which ran from 1971 to 1984, and brought world-wide attraction to Hartt with new organ music commissions and performances from major composers and organists, including Marilyn Mason, William Albright, Iannis Xenakis, and William Bolcom. In 1982, the festival expanded to include harpsichord music. In 2015, facing total declinement of enrollment, the school closed down its organ studies program and sold the Gress-Miles organ to United Methodist Church in Babylon, New York. As of 2022, faculty member Scott Lamlein re-started a Foundations of Organ Performance course available to Hartt piano students, taught on a 1986 Wolff studio pipe organ.

Notable faculty
The Hartt School's faculty perform, teach, and present all over the country and around the world. Notable faculty members have included: 
 Glen Adsit, conductor & founder of the National Wind Ensemble Consortium Group
 Robert Black, Bang on a Can All-Stars
 Robert Carl, composer
 John Feierabend, music education researcher and author
 Kevin Cobb, American Brass Quintet
 Steve Davis,  jazz trombonist
 Javon Jackson, jazz saxophonist
 Nat Reeves, jazz double bassist
Julia Smith, pianist and composer
Leonid Sigal, violinist
 Oxana Yablonskaya, pianist
 Jackie McLean, (former) jazz saxophonist and founder of the Jackie McLean Jazz program
 Rene McLean, jazz saxophonist and flutist
Gwyneth van Anden Walker, composer

Notable alumni

 John Barcellona, flutist 
 Peter Boyer, composer
 David Dodge Boyden, musicologist
 Robert Brubaker, tenor
 Larry Chesky, composer and Polka accordionist
 Javier Colon, musician, winner of The Voice
 David Cullen, guitarist
 Dan-O (Dan O'Connor), singer and composer
 Jimmy Greene, jazz alto saxophonist
 Ryan Speedo Green, bass-baritone opera singer
 Laurel Hurley, soprano
 Marin Ireland, film, stage and television actress
 Barbara Kolb, composer
 Mia Love, U.S. Representative from Utah
 Rob Moose, musician
 Houston Person, jazz saxophonist
 Carmino Ravosa, composer
 Francesca Roberto, soprano
 Teresa Stich-Randall, soprano
 Joe Souza, actor
 Gwyneth van Anden Walker, composer
 Dionne Warwick, pop singer and multiple Grammy winner
 Doreen Ketchens, trad jazz clarinetist and New Orleans music ambassador
 Tony MacAlpine, Grammy-nominated guitarist and pianist
 Keir O'Donnell, actor
 Charles Nelson Reilly, actor, teacher
 Lynne Strow Piccolo, soprano
 Andrew Ardizzoia, composer
 Marcus Barone(Mark Barone) Film Music Executive, Supervisor, Composer

References

External links

 
 
Schools in Hartford County, Connecticut
Music schools in Connecticut
Educational institutions established in 1920
1920 establishments in Connecticut